Jothi is a 2021 Indian Tamil-language supernatural fantasy thriller television series, which aired on Sun TV in every weekend and later rescheduled to air on every Sunday. It was produced by Sundar C under the studio of Avni Telemedia. 

It starred Meghasri portraying the titular role, along with Chandana Shetty and Vishnu Unnikrishnan in the lead roles. This show was a sequel of "Nandini". The series went off air on 1 August 2021.

Synopsis
The story of the serial moves as a woman named Sivagami, falls in love with a mysterious man Aadhisheshan, who is a powerful shapeshifting snake. Sivagami and Aadhisheshan both get married and they had two girls- Jothi and Shreya. Jothi inherited human quality also snake powers and Sherya inherited the snake quality. Unaware of her shape shifting serpent powers Jothi, the Nagaloga prince's sole heir is a maid at her own palace, while enduring several hardships from evil serpent forces & her ill-treating family. How she finds her true identity, marries the love of her life and acquires the ‘Nagamanickam’ unravels as a mystical tale.

Cast

Main
 Meghasri as Jothi Anirudh: A human element but has a snake powers. Aadhisheshan and Sivagami's elder daughter, Shreya's sister, Anirudh's wife; she was adopted and working as a servant in the palace and later turned as daughter-in-law. 
 Chandana Shetty as Shreya: A Shapeshifting ("Icchadhari") snake. Aadhisheshan and Sivagami's younger daughter, Jothi's sister. She was protecting the "Naga Rathinam".
 Vishnu Unnikrishnan as Anirudh: Vasuki and Rajashekar's son, Padmavathi's grandson; Jothi's husband

Recurring
 Seema as Padmavathi
 Ramesh Pandit as Rajashekar
 Mercy Layal as Vasuki Rajashekar
 Anuradha 
 Neela Menon as Leelavathi
Advani as Naveena
Sankavi as Manasa
Sivasankar Master as Hakkim Bhai
Jeeva Rajendran as Chandru
Anu Mohan as Rangan
Eesan Sujatha as Saraswathi
KPY Palani as Korea 
Pollachi Babu
Singamuthu
Geetha Narayanan as Indhrasena
Master Ashwin
VJ Settai Senthil as Kumar
Kottachi

Special appearances
Nassar as Narasimhan - Jothi and Shreya's grandfather, Sivagami's father and  Padmavathi's brother (Photographic appearance only)
Kushboo Sundar as Sivagami Aadhisheshan - Jothi and Shreya's mother
Aishwarya as Sambhavi - Padmavathi and Narasimhan's sister (Photographic appearance only)
Power Star Srinivasan as Minister Nagarajan

Dubbed Versions

References

External links 
 

Sun TV original programming
Tamil-language fantasy television series
Tamil-language horror fiction television series
Tamil-language romance television series
2021 Tamil-language television series debuts
Tamil-language television shows
2021 Tamil-language television series endings
Television series about snakes
Television series about shapeshifting
Tamil-language sequel television series